Kalkspruit (also known as Ga-Maraba) is a large village in Ga-Mashashane in the Polokwane Local Municipality Capricorn District Municipality in the Limpopo province of South Africa. The village is located on the Matlala Road about 30km west of the city of Polokwane.

References

Populated places in the Polokwane Local Municipality